Manasses of Hierges was an important crusader and constable of the Kingdom of Jerusalem. He was lord of Ramla from 1150 to 1152.

Family and pedigree
The dates of his birth and death are unknown, as indeed are the details of his life outside the period spent in Jerusalem. Manasses was the son of Hodierna of Rethal and Héribrand II of Hierges. His maternal grandfather was Hugh I of Rethel and maternal uncle was Baldwin II of Jerusalem. He married Helvis of Ramla, widow of Barisan of Ibelin, in around 1150. This allowed Manasses to establish himself in the east not only with the favour of his royal relatives but also with much land and money. On behalf of Helvis, he ruled Ramlah and Mirabel, and virtually the entire southern part of Palestine, with the exception of the Lordship of Ibelin, which was inherited by Helvis and Barisan's son Hugh of Ibelin. Manasses and Helvis had two daughters, one of whom may have been born after his exile in 1152.

Crusades
Manasses arrived in Jerusalem around 1140 and was appointed  constable of Jerusalem, the highest office of the kingdom, by his cousin Queen Melisende after the death of her husband King Fulk in 1143. As constable, he was in command of the army, and was sent to relieve the siege of Edessa in 1144. He did not arrive in time and the city fell to Zengi. In response to the fall of Edessa, the Second Crusade arrived in Jerusalem in 1148. Manasses was present at the Council of Acre that year when they decided to attack Damascus, but the siege of Damascus was a failure and the crusade dispersed. 

According to William of Tyre, Manasses "is said to have conducted himself very haughtily. He assumed an insolent attitude of superiority towards the elders of the realm and refused to show them proper respect." With his newfound power, he made many enemies among the more established older nobles, and Melisende's son Baldwin III especially hated him for keeping him out of government and alienating him from his mother. Manasses supported Melisende against Baldwin III when Baldwin attempted to claim full power in 1152. Baldwin had himself crowned separately and the kingdom was divided between him and Melisende, with Melisende keeping Jerusalem and Nablus in the south and Baldwin ruling from Acre and Tyre in the north. Baldwin appointed a constable of his own, Humphrey II of Toron, and soon invaded the south. He forced Manasses to surrender his castle of Mirabel, and captured Jerusalem from Melisende. Manasses was exiled and permanently replaced as constable by Humphrey.

References

William of Tyre, A History of Deeds Done Beyond the Sea, trans. E.A. Babcock and A.C. Krey. Columbia University Press, 1943
Steven Runciman, A History of the Crusades, vol. II: The Kingdom of Jerusalem. Cambridge University Press, 1952
Hans E. Meyer, "Studies in the History of Queen Melisende of Jerusalem", Dumbarton Oaks Papers 26 (1972)

Christians of the Second Crusade
Lords of Ramla
12th-century deaths